Mesgaran (also Romanized as Mesgarān) is a village in Momenabad Rural District, Central District, Sarbisheh County, South Khorasan Province, Iran. At the 2006 census, its population was 22, in 5 families.

References 

Populated places in Sarbisheh County